A formula game is an artificial game represented by a fully quantified Boolean formula. Players' turns alternate and the space of possible moves is denoted by bound variables. If a variable is universally quantified, the formula following it has the same truth value as the formula beginning with the universal quantifier regardless of the move taken. If a variable is existentially quantified, the formula following it has the same truth value as the formula beginning with the existential quantifier for at least one move available at the turn. Turns alternate, and a player loses if he cannot move at his turn. FORMULA-GAME is PSPACE-complete.

References

 Sipser, Michael. (2006).  Introduction to the Theory of Computation.  Boston: Thomson Course Technology.

Satisfiability problems
Boolean algebra
PSPACE-complete problems